Steve Cutler may refer to:

Steve Cutler (rugby union), Australia rugby union player
Steve Cutler (wrestler), American professional wrestler